Rogów may refer to:

Rogów, Greater Poland Voivodeship (west-central Poland)
Rogów, Lesser Poland Voivodeship (south Poland)
Rogów, Brzeziny County in Łódź Voivodeship (central Poland)
Rogów, Łęczyca County in Łódź Voivodeship (central Poland)
Rogów, Piotrków County in Łódź Voivodeship (central Poland)
Rogów, Opole Lubelskie County in Lublin Voivodeship (east Poland)
Rogów, Zamość County in Lublin Voivodeship (east Poland)
Rogów, Sokołów County in Masovian Voivodeship (east-central Poland)
Rogów, Szydłowiec County in Masovian Voivodeship (east-central Poland)
Rogów, Opole Voivodeship (south-west Poland)
Rogów, Silesian Voivodeship (southern Poland)
Rogów, Kazimierza County in Świętokrzyskie Voivodeship (south-central Poland)
Rogów, Końskie County in Świętokrzyskie Voivodeship (south-central Poland)
Rogów, West Pomeranian Voivodeship (north-west Poland)